Radlická is a Prague Metro station on Line B, located in Radlice, Prague 5. It was opened on 26 October 1988 as part of the line extension from Smíchovské nádraží to Nové Butovice.

Gallery

References

Prague Metro stations
Railway stations opened in 1988
1988 establishments in Czechoslovakia
Railway stations in the Czech Republic opened in the 20th century